The Financial Information System for California (also known as the Department of FI$Cal or FI$Cal) is a state government agency in the California Government Operations Agency of the executive branch of the government of California. The department is working toward full management and operation of its FI$Cal system.

Current director Miriam Barcellona Ingenito has led the Department since its formal recognition in July 2016.

As of March 2019, the State of California has spent more than $900 million on the Fi$Cal system.

History
In July 2016, the California Department of Financial Information System for California (FI$Cal) was formally recognized as a new state of California department.

In May 2017, the Department of FI$Cal released its first strategic five-year plan, covering the years 2017–2021. This first plan covers the remaining years of implementation and the initial years of operation and maintenance.

As of March 2019, the FI$Cal system had 15,000 end users processing expenditures of $300 billion per year.

Purpose
The FI$Cal project modernizes the State of California financial IT infrastructure. It replaces hundreds of State of California financial systems (e.g., accounting, procurement, and budgeting).

Offices and divisions
The agency is organized into several divisions and offices:
Service Center and Portfolio Management Division
Business Operation and Solutions Division
Administrative Division
Information Technology Division

Criticism
The FI$Cal system has received criticism for repeated delays and cost overruns. State Controller Betty Yee has expressed concern its unreliability could undermine the State of California's credit rating.

References

External links 
 

State agencies of California
Government agencies established in 2016
2016 establishments in California